Hibbertia mediterranea is a species of flowering plant in the family Dilleniaceae and is endemic to southern Queensland. It is a much-branched, spreading shrub that has glabrous foliage except on new growth, linear leaves, and yellow flowers with thirty to thirty-eight stamens arranged around three carpels.

Description 
The flowers are arranged singly on the ends of the branches and short side shoots and are sessile.

Taxonomy 
Hibbertia mediterranea was first formally described in 2013 by Hellmut R. Toelken in the Journal of the Adelaide Botanic Gardens from specimens collected in Sundown National Park in 1996. The specific epithet (mediterranea) means "remote from the sea" and refers to the species' inland distribution.

Distribution and habitat 
This hibbertia grows in forest understorey on the Darling Downs in southern Queensland.

See also 
 List of Hibbertia species

References 

mediterranea
Flora of Queensland
Plants described in 2013
Taxa named by Hellmut R. Toelken